After Class (originally titled Safe Spaces) is a 2019 American comedy-drama film written and directed by Daniel Schechter and starring Justin Long, Kate Berlant, Lynn Cohen, Michael Godere, Fran Drescher and Richard Schiff. It premiered at the 2019 Tribeca Film Festival, and was released in theaters on December 6, 2019.

Cast
 Justin Long as Josh Cohn
 Kate Berlant as Jackie Cohn
 Michael Godere as David Cohn
 Lynn Cohen as Agatha
 Fran Drescher as Diane Cohn
 Richard Schiff as Jeff Cohn
 Silvia Morigi as Caterina
 Becky Ann Baker as Mary
 Tyler Wladis as Ben Cohn
 Samrat Chakrabarti as Terry
 Nic Inglese as Alan
 Emily Ferguson as Jennifer
 Bryce Romero as Peter

Reception
After Class has received generally positive reviews from critics. ,  of the  reviews compiled on Rotten Tomatoes are positive, with an average rating .

References

External links
 
 

American comedy-drama films
2019 comedy-drama films
2019 films
2010s English-language films
2010s American films